Duncan Taylor (born 5 September 1989) is a Scottish Rugby Union player. His regular playing position is centre. He plays for Saracens in the English Premiership.

Early life and education
Taylor travelled extensively during his childhood and lived in England, Scotland and Australia.   He qualifies for Scotland through his Scottish parents.

Taylor was educated at Davidson Mains Primary School in Edinburgh, Olney Middle School (playing rugby for Olney RFC), Davidson School in Sydney, Australia (playing for Garigal RFC), a return to Olney Middle School, then Ousedale School in Newport Pagnell.

Rugby playing career
Taylor did not play for a county  or country junior sides.

Club level
Taylor signed for Bedford Blues aged 17. He then joined Saracens on a dual-registration deal in the summer of 2011.

Mark McCall has described Taylor as an underappreciated player, and as a very popular player in the Saracens squad, and he has been described as a 'player's player.' During his time at Saracens he has won two Premiership finals in 2015 and 2016, scoring a try in the 2016 final. He also helped Saracens win the European Champions Cup in 2016 and 2017.

International level
Taylor first earned international honours representing Scotland A during their 2013 campaign.   He scored a famous try in their first ever victory away to England Saxons at the sixth time of trying.

His impressive performances during the 2012–2013 season were rewarded when he was called up the senior Scotland squad for their Summer tour to South Africa. He made his full debut against Samoa later that year.

Playing for a club with a heavy fixture load has on occasion not helped Taylor's international career, at a time when Scotland had many player options at centre.

Injuries

Taylor tore his hamstring during Scotland's 2016 summer tour of Japan. He then had 2 ankle-related operations, shoulder problems, and  concussions. He suffered a head injury in 1/18 and ligament injuries in 9/18.

References

External links
 Duncan Taylor itsrugby.co.uk Player Statistics

1989 births
Living people
Scottish rugby union players
Rugby union centres
Saracens F.C. players
Bedford Blues players
Rugby union players from Northampton
English people of Scottish descent
Scotland international rugby union players